The 1991 Macau Grand Prix Formula Three was the 38th Macau Grand Prix race to be held on the streets of Macau on 24 November 1991. It was the eighth edition for Formula Three cars.

Entry list

Race Results

References

F2 Register

External links
 The official website of the Macau Grand Prix

Macau Grand Prix
Grand
Macau